"Love Addiction" is a song by Australian singer, songwriter, Robyn Loau. The song was released in April 1998 as the second single from Loau's debut studio album studio album, Malaria: The Lost Album (2008). The single peaked at number 66 on the ARIA Charts.

Track listing

Charts

References
  

1997 songs
1998 singles
Robyn Loau songs
Polydor Records singles
Songs written by Robyn Loau